Florian Marciniak (codenames: Jerzy Nowak, Nowak, J.Krzemień, Szary, Flo; born 4 May 1915, Gorzyce, Kościan County – died 20/21 February   1944, Gross-Rosen) was a Polish scoutmaster (harcmistrz), and the first Naczelnik (Chief Scout) of the paramilitary scouting resistance organization, the Szare Szeregi, during the Second World War.

Marciniak was a graduate of St. John Cantius High School in Poznań. He was arrested by the Gestapo on 6 May 1943 and murdered in February 1944 at the Gross-Rosen concentration camp.

1915 births
1944 deaths
People from Kościan County
Polish resistance members of World War II
Polish Scouts and Guides
People who died in Gross-Rosen concentration camp
Military personnel who died in Nazi concentration camps
Polish military personnel killed in World War II
Polish people executed in Nazi concentration camps
Executed people from Greater Poland Voivodeship
Resistance members killed by Nazi Germany